José Reyes may refer to:

Arts and entertainment
José Reyes Meza (1924–2011), Mexican painter and costume and set designer
José Reyes (flamenco) (1928–1979), Spanish flamenco singer with Manitas de Plata
Jose Javier Reyes (born 1954), Filipino writer, director, and actor
José Reyes Juárez, Mexican mask maker

Politics and law
J. B. L. Reyes (1902–1994), Filipino jurist; Associate Justice of the Philippine Supreme Court
José Reyes Estrada Aguirre (1929–1989), Mexican politician, mayor of Ciudad Juárez
Jose Reyes Jr. (born 1950), Filipino jurist; Associate Justice on the Philippine Supreme Court
José Reyes Ferriz (born 1961), Mexican politician, mayor of Ciudad Juárez
José Reyes Baeza Terrazas (born 1961), Mexican politician, governor of Chihuahua

Sports

Association football (soccer)
José Pilar Reyes (born 1955), Mexican football goalkeeper
José Antonio Reyes (1983–2019), Spanish footballer
José Rodolfo Reyes (born 1988), Mexican footballer
José Miguel Reyes (born 1992), Venezuelan footballer
José Reyes (Honduran footballer) (born 1997), Honduran footballer
José Ismael Reyes (born 2001), Mexican footballer

Other sports
José Reyes (canoeist) (born 1966), Spanish sprint canoeist
José Pérez Reyes (born 1975), Dominican boxer
José Reyes (infielder) (born 1983), Dominican baseball player; all-star MLB infielder 
José Reyes (catcher) (born 1983), Dominican baseball catcher for MLB's Chicago Cubs

Others
José Trinidad Reyes (1797–1855), Honduran priest
José Reyes Vega (fl. 1920s), Mexican priest and military general
José María Reyes Mata (1943–1983), Honduran revolutionary
José J. Reyes (born 1963), Puerto Rican military officer
José Antonio Reyes (astronomer), Spanish astronomer

Other uses
José R. Reyes Memorial Medical Center, Filipino hospital in Manila